Fast Folk Musical Magazine (originally known as The CooP) was a combination magazine and record album published from February 1982 to 1997. The magazine acted as a songwriter/performer cooperative, and was an outlet for singer-songwriters to release their first recordings.

History
In December 1977, singer-songwriter Carolyne Mas started a songwriter's night at The Cornelia Street Cafe in Greenwich Village, New York, after a less formal group started by singer-songwriter/Greenwich Village legend Jack Hardy lost its spot at a local tavern called The English Pub. The group, which included artists like Jack Hardy, Carolyne Mas, David Massengill, Tom Intondi, Cliff Eberhardt, Michael Fracasso, Matthias Clark, Jeff Gold, and Rod MacDonald, gave writers a chance to perform for their peers, work on songs in front of an audience, and receive feedback from fellow songwriters. This group, sans some members, and with some new members added, eventually became known as the Songwriter's Exchange, recording an album on Stash Records which was released in 1980. The album was made possible due to the efforts of Robin Hirsch, one of the owners of The Cornelia Street Cafe, who single-handedly had turned the increasingly popular café into a hotbed of artists, musicians, poets, and writers. The Greenwich Village music scene was also booming at the time, receiving much media attention from major newspapers like The New York Times, which also helped fuel the popularity of the New York singer-songwriter scene in general. The Songwriter's Exchange eventually evolved, and under the guidance of Jack Hardy, the group formed a cooperative and took over the booking of Greenwich Village's SpeakEasy in 1981. The CooP, which was launched in February 1982, was later renamed Fast Folk, and gained status as a non-profit organization.

The organization formed at a time when the cost of recording equipment and packaging of vinyl LPs were prohibitively expensive for the independent artist. The organization managed to document serious, non-commercial songwriting first in the form of vinyl LPs and later as CDs. Although many of the writers were active in the Greenwich Village scene, the magazine included artists from across the United States and some international artists. Some of the included writers went on to commercial success, and some became influences in newly formed musical genres such as alternative country and anti-folk.

Alumni who recorded first for Fast Folk include Grammy Award-winners Lyle Lovett, Suzanne Vega, Julie Gold, Tracy Chapman and Shawn Colvin, as well as John Gorka, Michelle Shocked, Suzy Bogguss, Rod MacDonald, Christine Lavin, Richard Shindell, Marilyn Jaye Lewis and Lucy Kaplansky of Cry Cry Cry.  Over 600 writers and 2000 songs were documented.

Smithsonian Folkways Recordings
Smithsonian Folkways Recordings, now maintains an archive of Fast Folk which includes the master recording tapes, magazines and paper records of the organization.

They also released a compilation album titled Fast Folk: A Community of Singers & Songwriters.

References

External links 
 Archives at the Smithsonian Center for Folklife and Cultural Heritage
 Fast Folk and Coop Database, with artist crossreferences, by Steven Alexander
 Fast Folk Musical Magazine page at balladtree.com
 SpeakEasy Musician's Cooperative
 [ Fast Folk Musical Magazine] entry at Allmusic

1982 establishments in New York City
1997 disestablishments in New York (state)
American folk music
Defunct magazines published in the United States
Folk music magazines
Folk record labels
Greenwich Village
Irregularly published magazines published in the United States
Magazines established in 1982
Magazines disestablished in 1997
Magazines published in New York (state)
Music of New York City
Music magazines published in the United States
Monthly magazines published in the United States